This is a list of submissions to the 86th Academy Awards for Best Foreign Language Film. The Academy of Motion Picture Arts and Sciences (AMPAS) has invited the film industries of various countries to submit their best film for the Academy Award for Best Foreign Language Film every year since the award was created in 1956. The award is presented annually by the Academy to a feature-length motion picture produced outside the United States that contains primarily non-English dialogue. The Foreign Language Film Award Committee oversees the process and reviews all the submitted films.

For the 86th Academy Awards, which were held on 2 March 2014, the submitted films must be first released theatrically in their respective countries for seven consecutive days between 1 October 2012 and 30 September 2013. The deadline for submissions was 1 October 2013, with the Academy announcing a list of eligible films later that month. Seventy-six countries submitted a film for consideration in the category before the deadline, Moldova and Saudi Arabia are first-time entrants, alongside Montenegro submitting for the first time as an independent country. Pakistan submitted a film for the first time in 50 years.

Nine finalists were announced in December 2013, which were shortlisted in January, with the final five nominees announced on 16 January 2014. The winner of the 86th Academy Award for Best Foreign Language Film was Italy's The Great Beauty, which was directed by Paolo Sorrentino.

Submissions

Notes 
  The Czech Republic initially selected the cinematic version of Agnieszka Holland's television mini-series Burning Bush. AMPAS disqualified the film, citing regulations that the film must not have initially appeared on television. The mini-series aired on Czech TV eight months prior to the re-edited version that appeared in cinemas.
  Lebanon initially selected Amin Dora's Ghadi in a two-way race over Lara Saba's Blind Intersections. When the film's release date was moved from 26 September 2013 to 31 October 2013, it no longer met the eligibility dates and Blind Intersections became the official submission from Lebanon. However, Ghadi''' became Lebanon's submission the following year.
  Macedonia's Association of Filmmakers had two candidates: Balkan Is Not Dead and The Piano Room, but it could not recommend either film for submission. In a statement they said "According to the topics treated and the way that they are shown in both films, the commission considers they are not appropriate to be nominated" and "In addition, the committee unanimously decided this year not to [propose] any film."
  Vietnam's Ministry of Culture assembled an official selection committee and launched an open call for entries. However, on 19 September 2013, the National Cinema Department announced they had no films that are eligible to compete. The only film that applied to represent the country, Thiên Mệnh Anh Hùng (Blood Letter'') was released too early to qualify.

References

External links 
 Official website of the Academy Awards

2012 film awards
2013 film awards
86